Magnus Waade Myklebust (born 8 July 1985 in Ulsteinvik) is a Norwegian football striker who currently plays for Bergsöy IL.

He is the cousin of Jan Åge Fjørtoft.

Career statistics

References

External links
Guardian's Stats Centre
Magnus Myklebust at NFF

1985 births
Living people
People from Ulstein
Sportspeople from Møre og Romsdal
Norwegian footballers
Norway under-21 international footballers
Norway youth international footballers
IL Hødd players
Lillestrøm SK players
Odds BK players
Eliteserien players
Kongsvinger IL Toppfotball players
Norwegian First Division players
Association football forwards